Eke Uzoma  (born 11 August 1989) is a Nigerian-Hungarian professional footballer who plays as a left-back for Tennis Borussia Berlin.

Career
Uzoma was born in Owerri, Imo State, Nigeria. He began his professional career with SC Freiburg. His first real impact in the German football world came when he scored a goal against 1. FC Köln on 26 September 2007, in only his fourth match.  This goal was voted goal of the week on German football show Sportschau and was nominated for goal of the month. In 2009, he helped SC Freiburg earn promotion to the Bundesliga. On 24 October 2009, he made his first appearance in the Bundesliga for Freiburg and became the 5,000th player in the history of the Bundesliga.

On 1 January 2010, he was loaned to TSV 1860 Munich and he transferred eventually to 1860 Munich in summer 2010.

After playing the first half of the 2015–16 season in the Serbian SuperLiga with FK Spartak Subotica, in the winter-break he returned to Germany, this time by signing with Chemnitzer FC.

Following a season with Hungarian club Tiszakécske FC in the Nemzeti Bajnokság II, Uzoma moved to Tennis Borussia Berlin of the Regionalliga Nordost.

Honors
SC Freiburg
2. Bundesliga: 2008–09

References

External links
 

1989 births
Living people
People from Owerri
Sportspeople from Imo State
Nigerian footballers
Association football midfielders
SC Freiburg players
TSV 1860 Munich players
Arminia Bielefeld players
Pécsi MFC players
SV Sandhausen players
FK Spartak Subotica players
Chemnitzer FC players
Berliner AK 07 players
Balmazújvárosi FC players
Budapest Honvéd FC players
Tiszakécske FC footballers
Tennis Borussia Berlin players
Bundesliga players
2. Bundesliga players
3. Liga players
Regionalliga players
Nemzeti Bajnokság I players
Nemzeti Bajnokság II players
Serbian SuperLiga players
Nigerian expatriate footballers
Nigerian expatriate sportspeople in Germany
Expatriate footballers in Germany
Nigerian expatriate sportspeople in Hungary
Expatriate footballers in Hungary
Nigerian expatriate sportspeople in Serbia
Expatriate footballers in Serbia